The American Samoa national basketball team are the basketball side that represent American Samoa in international competitions.

Competitive record

FIBA Oceania Championship

Oceania Basketball Tournament (Pacific Mini Games)

 1981: 4th
 1985: 
 1989-1993: ?
 1997: 
 2001-2013: ?

Pacific Games

 1963: 
 1966: ?
 1969: 6th
 1971: 
 1975: 
 1979: 
 1983: 
 1987: 
 1991: 
 1995-2007: ?
 2011: 5th
 2015: 6th
 2019: To be determined

Roster
At the 2015 Pacific Games:

See also
American Samoa national under-19 basketball team
American Samoa women's national basketball team

References
2007 American Samoa Men's National Basketball Team

External links
American Samoa Basketball Association at Facebook

Men's national basketball teams
Basketball in American Samoa
Basketball
1976 establishments in American Samoa